Iron Flowers may refer to:
 Iron Flowers (Grey DeLisle album), 2005
 Iron Flowers (Repeater album), 2008